Amanpreet Ahluwalia is an Indian racing driver and a national Go-Karting champion and national Autocross Champion. He was the National Champion two years running in the National Karting Championship in 2002-03.

Background 
Ahluwalia was born in Pathankot, India. He started his motorsports career at the age of 18. He subsequently moved onto other forms of competitive motorsports like Formula FISSME, sprints, autocross, raids and rallying. He remains one of the only Indians to have taken part in all forms of the sport. Aman was also part of the first Indian racing team known as Team Valvoline. He is the founder of Auto Attitudes Motorsports.

Career

Racing career summary

References 

Living people
Indian racing drivers
People from Pathankot district
Year of birth missing (living people)
Ahluwalia